Kamensky is a Russian surname. Notable people with the surname include:

Aleksandr Kamensky (1922–1992), Russian art critic and art historian
Jane Kamensky (born 1963), American historian
Mikhail Kamensky (1738–1809), Russian field marshal
Nikolay Kamensky (1776–1811), Russian general, son of Mikhail Kamensky
Sergei Kamensky (1771–1834), Russian general
Valeri Kamensky (born 1966), Russian hockey player
Vasily Kamensky (1884–1961), Russian Cubo-futurist poet

See also
 Kaminsky, a surname

Russian-language surnames